The Indictment (French: Le réquisitoire) is a 1931 drama film directed by Dimitri Buchowetzki and starring Marcelle Chantal, Fernand Fabre and Elmire Vautier. It was made by Paramount Pictures at the Joinville Studios in Paris as the French-language version of Manslaughter. Paramount was a leader in producing Multi-language versions during the early 1930s, and German, Spanish and Swedish versions were also made of the film.

Cast
 Marcelle Chantal as Lydia Alton  
 Fernand Fabre as Georges Sainclair 
 Elmire Vautier as Eliane Belling 
 Gaston Jacquet as J.B. Albey  
 Héléna Manson as Annette Evans  
 Rachel Launay as Mlle. Bennett  
 Pierre Piérade as Carter  
 Pierre Labry as Peters  
 Raymond Leboursier as Bobby  
 Max Arditi as Alex  
 André Brévannes as Alfred  
 Maurice Maillot 
 Renée Fleury

References

Bibliography 
 Beckman, Karen. Crash: Cinema and the Politics of Speed and Stasis. Duke University Press, 2010.

External links 
 

1931 films
American multilingual films
1930s French-language films
Films directed by Dimitri Buchowetzki
Films shot at Joinville Studios
1931 drama films
American drama films
American black-and-white films
Films based on works by Alice Duer Miller
1931 multilingual films
1930s American films